Chheam Entri Khmau is a 1974 Cambodian film directed by actor, Vann Vannak. The film stars Vann Vannak himself and actress Saom Vansodany. The song "Luh Ksay Bang Smok" by Sinn Sisamouth and Ros Serey Sothea remains a popular duet from the film.

Cast
Vann Vannak
Saom Vansodany

Soundtrack

1974 films
Khmer-language films
Cambodian drama films